Maria Mercedes Capa Estrada (born 23 August 1980 in Valladolid) is a goalball athlete from Spain.  She has a disability: she is blind and a B2 type goalball player. She played goalball at the 1996 Summer Paralympics. Her team was third.

References 

Living people
1980 births
Paralympic bronze medalists for Spain
Sportspeople from Valladolid
Goalball players at the 1996 Summer Paralympics
Paralympic medalists in goalball
Medalists at the 1996 Summer Paralympics
Paralympic goalball players of Spain